Rear Admiral Martin Noel Lucey CB DSC (21 January 1920 – 8 July 1992) was a Royal Navy officer who became Flag Officer, Scotland and Northern Ireland and Admiral President Royal Naval College, Greenwich.

Naval career
Educated at Gresham's School, Holt, Norfolk, Lucey entered the Royal Navy in 1938. He served in the Second World War being promoted lieutenant in 1941 and being awarded the DSC in 1944. He became commanding officer of the frigate HMS Puma as well as captain of the 7th Frigate Squadron in early 1966, director of Seamen Officer Appointments later that year, and Senior Naval Officer West Indies in 1968. He went on to be Admiral President Royal Naval College, Greenwich in 1970 and Flag Officer, Scotland and Northern Ireland in 1972 before retiring in 1974.

In retirement Lucey lived in Houghton, West Sussex, and died on 8 July 1992.

Family
In 1947 he married Barbara Mary Key. They had two sons and one daughter.

References

|-

1920 births
1992 deaths
Admiral presidents of the Royal Naval College, Greenwich
Companions of the Order of the Bath
People educated at Gresham's School
Royal Navy rear admirals
Recipients of the Distinguished Service Cross (United Kingdom)
Royal Navy officers of World War II